Çukurca is a village in the Yüksekova District of Hakkâri Province in Turkey. The village had a population of 555 in 2022. Çukurca was a hamlet of Demirkonak before receiving village status in 2014.

History 
The village was populated by 15 Assyrian families in 1850 and 30 families in 1877.

Population 
Population history of the village from 2015 to 2022:

References 

Villages in Yüksekova District
Kurdish settlements in Hakkâri Province
Historic Assyrian communities in Turkey